Clapham tube station could refer to one of a number of London Underground stations serving the Clapham area of south London:

 Clapham North
 Clapham Common
 Clapham South

National Rail station Clapham High Street is a short walk from Clapham North but is a separate station.

Disambig-Class London Transport articles